Horology (related to Latin ; ; , interfix -o-, and suffix -logy) is the study of the measurement of time. Clocks, watches, clockwork, sundials, hourglasses, clepsydras, timers, time recorders, marine chronometers, and atomic clocks are all examples of instruments used to measure time.  In current usage, horology refers mainly to the study of mechanical time-keeping devices, while chronometry more broadly includes electronic devices that have largely supplanted mechanical clocks for the best accuracy and precision in time-keeping.

People interested in horology are called horologists. That term is used both by people who deal professionally with timekeeping apparatuses (watchmakers, clockmakers), as well as aficionados and scholars of horology.  Horology and horologists have numerous organizations, both professional associations and more scholarly societies. The largest horological membership organisation globally is the NAWCC, the National Association of Watch and Clock Collectors, which is USA based, but also has local chapters elsewhere.

History

Museums and libraries

In Europe 
There are many horology museums and several specialized libraries devoted to the subject. One example is the Royal Greenwich Observatory, which is also the source of the Prime Meridian (longitude 0° 0' 0"), and the home of the first marine timekeepers accurate enough to determine longitude (made by John Harrison). Other horological museums in the London area include the Clockmakers' Museum, which re-opened at the Science Museum in October 2015, the horological collections at the British Museum, the Science Museum (London), and the Wallace Collection. The Guildhall Library in London contains an extensive public collection on horology. In Upton, also in the United Kingdom, at the headquarters of the British Horological Institute, there is the Museum of Timekeeping. A more specialised museum of horology in the United Kingdom is the Cuckooland Museum in Cheshire, which hosts the world's largest collection of antique cuckoo clocks.

One of the more comprehensive museums dedicated to horology is the Musée international d'horlogerie, in La Chaux-de-Fonds in Switzerland, which contains a public library of horology. The Musée d'Horlogerie du Locle is smaller but located nearby. Other good horological libraries providing public access are at the Musée international d'horlogerie in Switzerland, at La Chaux-de-Fonds, and at Le Locle.

In France, Besançon has the Musée du Temps (Museum of Time) in the historic Palais Grenvelle. In Serpa and Évora, in Portugal, there is the Museu do Relógio. In Germany, there is the Deutsches Uhrenmuseum in Furtwangen im Schwarzwald, in the Black Forest, which contains a public library of horology.

In North America 
The two leading specialised horological museums in North America are the National Watch and Clock Museum in Columbia, Pennsylvania, and the American Clock and Watch Museum in Bristol, Connecticut. Another museum dedicated to clocks is the Willard House and Clock Museum in Grafton, Massachusetts. One of the most comprehensive horological libraries open to the public is the National Watch and Clock Library in Columbia, Pennsylvania.

Organizations 
Notable scholarly horological organizations include:
 American Watchmakers-Clockmakers Institute – AWCI (United States of America)
 Antiquarian Horological Society – AHS (United Kingdom)
 British Horological Institute – BHI (United Kingdom)
 Chronometrophilia (Switzerland)
 Deutsche Gesellschaft für Chronometrie – DGC (Germany)
 Horological Society of New York – HSNY (United States of America)
 National Association of Watch and Clock Collectors – NAWCC (United States of America)
 UK Horology - UK Clock & Watch Company based in Bristol

World exhibitions 
 Geneva Time Exhibition
 Salon International de la Haute Horlogerie (SIHH)

Glossary

See also
 Dictionary of Horology

References

Further reading 

 
 Perman, Stacy, A Grand Complication: The Race to Build the World's Most Legendary Watch, Atria Books (Simon & Schuster), February 2013. 
 Berner, G.A., Illustrated Professional Dictionary of Horology, Federation of the Swiss Watch Industry FH 1961 - 2012
 Daniels, George, Watchmaking, London: Philip Wilson Publishers, 1981 (reprinted June 15, 2011)
 Beckett, Edmund, A Rudimentary Treatise on Clocks, Watches and Bells, 1903, from Project Gutenberg
 Grafton, Edward, Horology, a popular sketch of clock and watch making, London: Aylett and Jones, 1849

 
Timekeeping